Sulichay (also Romanized as Sūlīchāy) is a village in Bonab Rural District, in the Central District of Zanjan County, Zanjan Province, Iran. At the 2006 census, its population was 107, in 26 families.

References 

Populated places in Zanjan County